Belt of the Celts is the ninth album by Irish folk and rebel band The Wolfe Tones. The album features political songs such as Some Say the Devil is Dead

Track list 
 Misty Foggy Dew
 Quare Things in Dublin
 The Fairy Hills
 Connaught Rangers
 Bold Robert Emmet
 The Hare in the Heather
 Ta Na La
 Some Say the Devil is Dead
 General Munroe
 Hurlers March
 The West's Asleep
 The Boys of Barr na Sraide
 The Rose of Mooncoin
 Rory O'Moore

The Wolfe Tones albums
1978 albums